Novy Urengoy (lit: “New Urengoy”; Nenets: Едэй Уренгой, Edėy Urengoy) is a city in Yamalo-Nenets Autonomous Okrug, Russia. Population:  It is the second largest city in the autonomous okrug.

History

It was founded in 1975 after the discovery of the Urengoy gas field, one of the largest in Russia. Town status was granted to it in 1980.

Administrative and municipal status
Within the framework of administrative divisions, it is incorporated as the city of okrug significance of Novy Urengoy—an administrative unit with the status equal to that of the districts. As a municipal division, the city of okrug significance of Novy Urengoy is incorporated as Novy Urengoy Urban Okrug.

Climate

Nature

Novy Urengoy has a subarctic climate (Köppen climate classification Dfc). Precipitation is moderate, and is somewhat higher in summer than at other times of the year.

Economy
A major industry of the city is oil and gas production, with one of the largest gas fields in the world in the area and substantial prospects for further exploration. The government-owned company Gazprom is the main local employer.

Transportation
The city is situated on the Tyumen–Novy Urengoy railway line. Traveling north from Tyumen, Novy Urengoy is the last station of significance. Noyabrsk is the previous station of significance.

Novy Urengoy is along the Salekhard–Igarka Railway, "Dead Road". Extending from Novy Urengoy to Stary Nadym is one section of the "Railway of Death" that serves as an important freight railway.

The city is served by the Novy Urengoy Airport.

Sports

Fakel is a men's volleyball team competing in the Russian Volleyball Super League and playing at the Gazodobytchik Sports Center. In the 2008-09 season they finished third in the competition, behind Zenit Kazan and Iskra Odintsovo.

References

Notes

Sources

External links
Official website of Novy Urengoy 
Official website of Yamalo-Nenets Autonomous Okrug:  Novy Urengoy 
PRO New Urengoy - city portal 

Cities and towns in Yamalo-Nenets Autonomous Okrug
Populated places of Arctic Russia
Populated places established in 1975
1975 establishments in the Soviet Union
Socialist planned cities